Eupithecia karnaliensis is a moth in the family Geometridae. It is found in Afghanistan, the Great Western Himalaya Mountains (Jammu & Kashmir) and Nepal. It is found at altitudes between 2,200 and 3,200 meters.

References

Moths described in 2000
karnaliensis
Moths of Asia